The Móhē zhǐguān (Chinese: 摩訶止観; Pinyin: Móhē Zhǐguān; Wades-Giles: Mo-ho Chih-kuan, Rōmaji: Makashikan; Sanskrit: Mahaśamatha-vipaśyanā) is a major Buddhist doctrinal treatise based on lectures given by the Chinese Tiantai patriarch Zhiyi (538–597 CE) in 594. These lectures were compiled and edited by Zhiyi´s disciple Guanding (561-632) into seven chapters in ten fascicles.

The voluminous Mohe Zhiguan is a comprehensive Buddhist doctrinal summa which discusses meditation and various key Buddhist doctrines which was very influential in the development of Buddhist meditation and Buddhist philosophy in China. It is one of the central texts of Chinese Tiantai (and Japanese Tendai) Buddhism.

Overview
A major focus of the Móhē zhǐguān is the practice of samatha (止 zhǐ, calming or stabilizing meditation) and vipassana (觀 guān, clear seeing or insight). Zhiyi teaches two types of zhiguan - in sitting meditation and 'responding to objects in accordance with conditions' or practicing mindfully in daily life. Zhiyi uses quotes from all the Buddhist sutras available in China at the time, and tries to include all doctrines into his meditation system. The text is founded firmly on scripture, every key assertion of the text is supported by sutra quotations. In the Móhē zhǐguān, Zhiyi also discusses several key Buddhist doctrines in its exposition of meditative praxis. A major doctrinal view of the work is that of the superiority of the practice of "sudden" samatha-vipasyana which sees ultimate reality present at the very start of one's practice. In the fifth volume of this treatise, Zhiyi reveals the doctrine of "three thousand realms in a single life-moment" (ichinen sanzen), which is considered to be the core essence of his teachings.  

Zhiyi divides his meditation system into three major sets, the "twenty-five skillful devices", the "Four samādhis" (sizhǒng sānmèi 四種三昧) and the "ten modes of contemplation". 

The "twenty five skillful devices" are preparatory practices which include keeping the five precepts, being in a quiet place, adjusting food intake and posture as well as restraining desire in the five senses and restraining the five hindrances. 

The four samadhis are designed for beginners who wish to practice meditation intensively. They are:

"Constantly Seated Samādhi" (chángzuò sānmèi 常坐三昧) - 90 days of motionless sitting, leaving the seat only for reasons of natural need.
"Constantly Walking Samādhi" (chángxíng sānmèi 常行三昧) - 90 days of mindful walking and meditating on Amitabha.
"Half-Walking Half-Seated Samādhi" (bànxíng bànzuò sānmèi 半行半坐三昧) - Includes various practices such as chanting, contemplation of the emptiness of all dharmas and the "Lotus samādhi" which includes penance, prayer, worship of the Buddhas, and reciting the Lotus sutra. 
"Neither Walking nor Sitting Samādhi" (fēixíng fēizuò sānmèi 非行非坐三昧) - This includes "the awareness of mental factors" as they arise in the mind. One is to contemplate them as "not moving, not originated, not extinguished, not coming, not going.”

After the meditator has practiced the four samadhis, he then moves on to contemplating the "ten objects":

Contemplating the skandhas, ayatanas and dhātus. By itself this part takes up one fifth of the entire book. 
Kleshas
Illness
The karmic marks
Demonic forces appearing in one's mind
Various forms of dhyāna which might be distracting 
False views
Overwhelming pride
Śrāvaka-hood or the idea that Pratyekabuddha-hood is the ultimate goal (instead of full Buddhahood)
The idea that Bodhisattva-hood is the ultimate goal

The core of the exposition is taken up by the skandhas, ayatanas and dhatus, which are to be contemplated in ten "modes":

Contemplating objects as inconceivable.
Arousing compassionate thoughts (bodhicitta), vowing to save all beings
Skillful means for easing one's mind.
The thorough deconstruction of dharmas, the seeing of dharmas as being empty frees one of all attachment.
Knowing what penetrates and what obstructs the path.
Cultivating the steps to the path (the thirty seven aids to nirvana)
Regulating through auxiliary methods.
Knowing the stages of development in the path.
Peace through patient recognition.
Avoiding passionate attachment to dharmas.

The concept of the three truths is a key element in Zhiyi's exposition of the practice of contemplation. Zhiyi's "perfectly integrated threefold truth" is an extension of Nagarjuna's Two truths doctrine. This "round and inter-inclusive" truth is made up of emptiness, conventional existence, and the middle way between the first two, a simultaneous and integral affirmation of both. Contemplating a mental moment with regard to this truth or "threefold contemplation within one moment of mental activity" (yixin
sanguan) is seen as the highest form of contemplation and as the ultimate form of realization. It leads to universal salvation (du zhongsheng) because through the transformation of oneself, one can therefore transform others.

Commentaries
According to Rev. Jikai Dehn, the major commentaries on this text in the Tendai tradition are:

Zhanran’s (湛然) (711-782) Zhiguan fuxing zhuan hongjue 止觀 輔行傳弘決
Hōchibō Shōshin’s （寶地坊證真）(c. 1136-1220) Shiki 私記、 
Echō Chikū’s (慧澄癡空) (1780-1862) Kōgi (講義)
Daihō Shūdatsu’s (大寶守脱) (1804-1884) Kōjutsu 講述. 

The first is a Chinese commentary by the sixth Tiantai patriarch; the latter three are Japanese works.

References

Bibliography

Translations
Donner, Neal; Stevenson, Daniel B. (1993). The Great Calming and Contemplation: A Study and Annotated Translation of the First Chapter of Chih-i’s Mo-ho chih-kuan. Honolulu: University of Hawaii Press.
Swanson, Paul L.; trans. (2004). The Great Cessation and Contemplation (Mo-ho Chih-kuan, Chapter 1-6), CD-ROM, Tokyo: Kosei Publishing Co.
_. trans. (2017) Clear Serenity, Quiet Insight: T'ien-t'ai Chih-i's Mo-ho chih-kuan, 3 vols., Honolulu: University of Hawai'i Press.

Articles
Toshirō, Yamano (1987). Review: Makashikan kenkyū josetsu (摩訶止觀研究序説) (Prolegomena to the Study of the Mo ho chih kuan) by Rosan Ikeda; 池田魯參 . Japanese Journal of Religious Studies 14 (2/3), 267-270

External links
The Great Calm-Observation - Mo-Ho Chih-Kuan Partial English translation
SWANSON, Understanding Chih-i: Through a glass, darkly? (Book review)

Mahayana texts
Buddhist commentaries